Isabella was a 323-ton merchant ship built in Whitby, England in 1827. She made one voyage transporting convicts from Ireland to Australia. She was wrecked on a reef off the Caroline Islands in 1841.

Career
Isabella first appeared in the Register of Shipping for 1827 with J. Brown, master, and Nelson & Co. as owner. Her trade was Weymouth to the Baltic.

The entry for Isabella in Lloyd's Register for 1840 gave her master as "M'Ausland", her owner as H. Nelson, her homeport as London, and her trade as London to Sydney.

Under the command of Alexander McAusland and surgeon Henry Mahon, Isabella left Dublin, Ireland, on 5 March 1840 and arrived at Sydney on 24 July 1840, having sailed via the Cape of Good Hope. She embarked 119 female convicts, passengers, and cargo. No convicts died on the voyage.

Isabella sailed from Sydney for Newcastle on 27 August in ballast. She arrived back in Sydney on 6 October. On 22 December, Isabella left Port Jackson bound for Guam in ballast.

Fate
While sailing to Guam, Isabella was wrecked on a reef in the Caroline Islands on 30 January 1841. The crew reached Manila safely after twenty-seven days in the boats.

Citations and references
Citations

References
 
  

1827 ships
Ships built in Whitby
Convict ships to New South Wales
Age of Sail merchant ships
Merchant ships of the United Kingdom
Maritime incidents in January 1841
Shipwrecks of the Caroline Islands